This article is about flights operated by Jetstar, and does not include Jetstar Asia or Jetstar Japan destinations.

Jetstar flies to 22 domestic destinations in Australia and 16 international destinations in 10 countries across Asia, North America and Oceania. 

Following is a list of destinations Jetstar flies to as part of its scheduled services as of January 2023. Terminated destinations are also listed.

List

See also 

List of Jetstar Asia Airways destinations

References

Lists of airline destinations